Bruno Loerzer (22 January 1891 – 23 August 1960) was a German air force officer during World War I and World War II. Credited with 44 aerial victories during World War I, he was one of Germany's leading flying aces, as well as commander of one of the first Imperial German Air Service Jagdeschwaders.

Loerzer's close friendship with Hermann Goering led to Loerzer's service in the World War II Luftwaffe, with subsequent promotion to Generaloberst by the war's end. Goering described Loerzer as "his laziest general," but swept aside criticisms of him, commenting "I need someone I can drink a bottle of red wine with in the evening."

Career

World War I

Born in Berlin, Loerzer was a prewar army officer who learned to fly in 1914. Hermann Göring flew as Loerzer's observer from 28 October 1914 until late June 1915. Transferring to fighters, Loerzer flew with two  in 1916 before joining Jagdstaffel 26 in January 1917. By then he had scored two victories over French aircraft. He had his aircraft painted distinctively striped in black and white. As his victory score mounted, he was awarded the Iron Cross First Class and House Order of Hohenzollern. In November 1917, he and his squadron mate Goering each had 15 kills, and both still coveted the highest Prussian decoration - the blue enamel cross of the  Pour le Mérite. Thirty years later, Loerzer would snicker to colleagues that Goering had inflated his mission claims. "Do the same," Loerzer claimed Goering had urged him, "otherwise we'll never get ahead!"  His tally reached 20 victories at the end of October and he received the Pour le Mérite in February 1918.  

The same month, he took command of the newly formed Jagdgeschwader III, the third of Germany's famed "flying circuses." His aces included his brother Fritz, who claimed 11 victories. Leading Jasta 26 and three other squadrons, with Hermann Dahlmann's support as adjutant and wingman, Loerzer proved a successful wing commander. Equipped with the new BMW-engined Fokker D.VII, JG III cut a wide swath through Allied formations in the summer of 1918, and his own score mounted steadily. He achieved his last ten victories in September when he reached his final score of 44 victories.

Between the world wars

Loerzer irregularly fought with  anti-communist paramilitary units from December 1918 until March 1920.

On 15 March 1937, Loerzer was tasked with the creation of Jagdgeschwader 334 (JG 334—334th Fighter Wing) and appointed its first Geschwaderkommodore (wing commander). He held this position until 31 March 1938 when he was appointed Inspekteur der Jagdflieger (Inspector of Fighters). Command of JG 334 was then passed on to Oberstleutnant Werner Junck.

World War II

During the early war years he was commander of II Air Corps, being awarded the Knight's Cross of the Iron Cross in May 1940. His II Air Corps participated in the invasion of the Soviet Union in the summer of 1941, as a section of Kesselring's 2nd Air Fleet—in support of Field Marshal von Bock. His unit was transferred to Messina, Sicily in October 1941, and he remained there until the middle of 1943, when his section returned to the Italian mainland after suffering heavy losses.

In December 1942, Fighter Ace Werner Baumbach, Group Commander of III/Kampfgeschwader 30, wrote a letter to Hans Jeschonnek, then Chief of the General Staff of the Luftwaffe, regarding the heavy losses suffered by the II Air Corps under Loerzer's leadership. Loerzer showed his gratitude on the occasion of the Reichsmarshall's birthday in January 1944, where he presented Goering with a carload of black market goods from Italy - women's stockings, soaps, and other rare items, complete with a price list in order to keep black market prices uniform throughout Germany. 

In December 1944 he was assigned to the Fuhrerreserve. He retired in April 1945, and was captured by the Americans in May 1945, and held until 1948.

Postwar

Loerzer died in Hamburg in 1960, at the age of 69.

Awards
Iron Cross (1914)
 2nd Class: 7 March 1915
 1st Class: late 1917
 Knight's Cross Second Class of the Order of the Zähringer Lion with Swords: award date unknown
 Knight's Cross of the Royal House Order of Hohenzollern with Swords: late 1917
 Iron Cross (1939)
 2nd Class: unknown award date
 1st Class: 14 September 1939
Fliegerkorps.

Notes

References

Citations

Bibliography

 
 
 
 
 
Norman Franks et al. (1993). Above the Lines: A Complete Record of the Fighter Aces of the German *Air Service, Naval Air Service, and Flanders Marine Corps 1914-1918. Grub Street, London.
Anthony Kemp (1982, 1990 reprint). German Commanders of World War II. Osprey Pub., London.

External links
 

1891 births
1960 deaths
Military personnel from Berlin
People from the Province of Brandenburg
German World War I flying aces
Recipients of the Knight's Cross of the Iron Cross
Recipients of the Pour le Mérite (military class)
Luftstreitkräfte personnel
Luftwaffe World War II generals
Prussian Army personnel
Recipients of the clasp to the Iron Cross, 1st class
Colonel generals of the Luftwaffe
20th-century Freikorps personnel